Wellington County is a county located in Southwestern Ontario, Canada and is part of the Greater Golden Horseshoe. The county, made up of two towns and five townships, is predominantly rural in nature. However many of the residents in the southern part of the county commute to urban areas such as Guelph, Kitchener, Waterloo, Brampton, Mississauga, Toronto and Hamilton for employment. The northern part of the county (comprising Minto, Mapleton, and Wellington North townships) is made up of mainly rural farming communities, except for a few larger towns such as Mount Forest and Arthur. According to the 2021 census, the population of the county was 241,026.

In 2018, the Warden of the county was Kelly Linton (mayor of Centre Wellington) and there were 14 Councillors. Police services are provided by the Ontario Provincial Police. Schools are operated by the Upper Grand District School Board and by the Wellington Catholic District School Board.

Subdivisions
The county is made up of seven lower-tier municipalities (in order of population):

 Centre Wellington, Township of (population centres: Fergus, Elora)
 Guelph/Eramosa, Township of (population centre: Rockwood)
 Wellington North, Township of (population centres: Mount Forest, Arthur)
 Erin, Town of (population centre: Erin)
 Mapleton, Township of (population centre: Drayton)
 Minto, Town of (population centres: Palmerston, Harriston)
 Puslinch, Township of

The City of Guelph, although part of the Wellington census division, is a single-tier city, municipally independent of the county. The primary economy outside of the city consists of agriculture and aggregate mining. The county is a major supplier of sand and gravel for the western part of the Greater Toronto Area.

History

Evolution
In 1837, by an Act of the Legislative Assembly of Upper Canada, the District of Wellington was formed and a court house and jail in the town of Guelph were authorized. The District was named after England's Duke of Wellington and its territory formed the County of Waterloo for electoral purposes. The limestone county courthouse and jail in the castellated style was built in 1842-44 and was subsequently expanded.

In 1849, Wellington District was abolished, and Waterloo County remained for municipal and judicial purposes. The territory of the Bruce Peninsula became part of Waterloo in 1849, but was later withdrawn and transferred to Bruce County in 1851.

In January 1852, Waterloo County became the United Counties of Wellington, Waterloo and Grey. The new county of Waterloo was withdrawn in January 1853, and the remainder was renamed the United Counties of Wellington and Grey.

In January 1854, the United Counties was dissolved, and Wellington and Grey were separate counties for all purposes.

Guelph was incorporated as a City in 1879 and withdrawn from the county. Amaranth, East Garafraxa, East Luther and Orangeville were transferred to Dufferin County during the period 1874–1882.

The Wellington County Jail (in Late Gothic Revival Style) and the Governor's Residence (in Georgian style) at 74 Woolwich Street were built in 1911; they were designated by the city for "historic and architectural value" and as a National Historic Site in 1983. The property is now an Ontario Court of Justice.

Historic townships
By 1881, the county had settled into its present form, with the following townships and related towns and villages:

In 1999, seven new municipalities (Townships) were created within Wellington County through amalgamation.

From "poorhouse" to museum 
In 1877, the county opened the Wellington County House of Industry and Refuge, or Poorhouse as it was called, on Wellington Road 18 between Fergus and Elora. Over the years, approximately 1500 deserving poor, including those who were destitute, old and infirm or suffering from disabilities were housed here. The sixty bed house for inmates was surrounded by a 30-acre "industrial" farm with a barn for livestock that produced some of the food for the 70 residents and the staff and also provided work for them. Others worked in the House itself. According to a 2009 report by the Toronto Star, "pauperism was considered a moral failing that could be erased through order and hard work". A hospital was added in 1892. A nearby cemetery has 271 plots for those who died. In 1947 the House was converted into the Wellington County Home for the Aged and in 1975 the building reopened as the Wellington County Museum and Archives.

A historic plaque was erected at the museum, indicating that the "government-supported poorhouse" was "the shelter of last resort for the homeless and destitute, who traded spartan accommodations for domestic or agricultural labour".

Demographics

Community involvement and awards
In October 2008, the County of Wellington was named one of Canada's Top 100 Employers by Mediacorp Canada Inc. and featured in Maclean's newsmagazine. Later that month, the county was recognized as one of Waterloo Area's Top Employers and featured in the Guelph Mercury newspaper.

In 2014, the County of Wellington received Best Health and Wellness Strategy at the Canadian HR Awards. This award recognizes excellence in the area of corporate health and well-being.

In 2013 (Gold), and again in 2014 (Silver), the County of Wellington received Canada's Safest Employer in the Public Sector Award. Canada's Safest Employers Awards recognize organizations from all across Canada with outstanding accomplishments in promoting the health and safety of their workers.

In 2014 (Gold), and again in 2016 (Silver), the County of Wellington received Canada's Psychological Safety Award. Canada's Safest Employer Awards introduced a new Psychological Safety Award in 2014 to recognize organizations that are committed to employee mental health and are working towards implementing the National Standard for Psychological Health and Safety in the Workplace.

The County of Wellington in Ontario, Canada, embarked on the BR+E journey beginning in 2013. Two years later, the county has reaped significant rewards with the candle on the cake represented by two BREI awards at the BREI Annual Conference in 2014.

The County of Wellington proudly received the 2015 Employer of Distinction Award at an Award Ceremony presented by the Guelph and District Human Resources Professionals Association in Guelph.

In early 2018, Alma resident Jim deBock received the Ontario Medal for Good Citizenship for his extensive volunteer work.

Travel Region
Wellington County is part of the Hills of Headwaters Tourism Association and Central Counties of Ontario, two tourism related associations.

In addition to the Museum, attractions in the County recommended by users of the Tripadvisor web site include Elora Rapids, Elora Gorge Conservation Area, the Fergus Grand Theatre and the Elora Cataract Railway. Popular parks with lakes for day use include Rockwood Conservation Area and Belwood Lake.

See also

 List of counties in Ontario
 List of secondary schools in Ontario

Notes

References

Further reading

External links

 
Counties in Ontario
Southwestern Ontario